Sanko or Sankō may refer to

Sanko (surname)
Sankō, Ōita, a town in Japan
Sankō Shrine in Osaka, Japan
Sankō Line, a railway line in Japan
Sanko Grand Summer Championship, a defunct golf tournament held in Japan
Sanko Group, the parent corporation of Turkish textile manufacturer ISKO
Sanko Park, a shopping mall in Gaziantep, Turkey
Sanko University in Gaziantep, Turkey
Sanko Harvest, a ship that was wrecked in 1991